Kirkaldy is a common misspelling of the Scottish town Kirkcaldy. It is also a surname of Scottish origin. Notable people with the surname include:  

Andrew Kirkaldy (golfer) (1860–1934), Scottish golfer
Andrew Kirkaldy (racing driver) (born 1976), Scottish racing driver
David Kirkaldy (1820–1897), Scottish engineer giving his name to the
George Willis Kirkaldy (1873–1910), English entomologist
Hugh Kirkaldy (1868–1897), Scottish golfer 
Irene Morgan Kirkaldy (1917–2007), also known as Irene Morgan, African-American civil rights activist
James Kirkcaldy, treasurer of Scotland (also spelled Kirkcaldy)
Jane Kirkaldy (1869–1932), contributed greatly to the education of the generation of English women scientists
Kirkaldy Testing Museum, at his old works in Southwark, London
Roy Kirkaldy (c.1910 – 13 August 1973), Australian rugby league player
William Kirkcaldy of Grange, Scottish politician and soldier (also spelled Kirkcaldy)

See also
Kirkcaldy (disambiguation)

References

Surnames of Scottish origin